Los Sports was a Chilean sports magazine established on 16 March 1923. The magazine mostly covered articles about swimming, athletics, golf, horse riding, boxing, basketball, and hockey. It featured interviews with leading figures in sports and politics. The magazine was in circulation until 1931 and during its existence a total of 418 volumes were published.

References

1923 establishments in Chile
1931 disestablishments in Chile
Magazines published in Chile
Defunct magazines published in Chile
Magazines established in 1923
Magazines disestablished in 1931
Spanish-language magazines
Sports magazines